The 2014 Individual Speedway Junior World Championship was the 38th edition of the FIM World motorcycle speedway Under-21 Championships.

Like 2013, the competition took place over three rounds, which were staged in July, August, and October. Piotr Pawlicki Jr. took the title, the third Polish rider to do so in just four years.

Final Series

Classification 
The meeting classification was according to the points scored during the meeting (heats 1–20). The total points scored by each rider during each final meeting (heat 1–20) were credited also as World Championship points. The FIM Speedway Under 21 World Champion was the rider having collected most World Championship points at the end of the series. In case of a tie between one or more riders in the final overall classification, a run-off will decide the 1st, 2nd and 3rd place. For all other placings, the better-placed rider in the last final meeting will be the better placed rider.

See also 
 2014 Speedway Grand Prix
 2014 Team Speedway Junior World Championship

References 
 Round 1 Results
 Round 2 Results
 Round 3 Results

 
2014
World Individual Junior